Arsen Klinchaev (born on December 5, 1968, Luhansk, Ukrainian SSR, Soviet Union) is a Ukrainian politician, member of the Party of Regions, veteran of the war at Nagorny-Karabakh. Klinchaev is a leader of the All-Ukrainian organization Youth Guard.

In 2010 he unveiled the Memorial for the victims killed by OUN-UPA (Luhansk).

On March 11, 2014 he was detained by the Security Service of Ukraine.

References

External links
 
 
 
 
 

Living people
1968 births
People from Luhansk
Azerbaijani military personnel of the Nagorno-Karabakh War
Party of Regions politicians
Pro-Russian people of the 2014 pro-Russian unrest in Ukraine
People of the Luhansk People's Republic
People of Anti-Maidan